Ballygiblin GAA is a Gaelic Athletic Association club located outside Mitchelstown, County Cork, Ireland. The club is solely concerned with the game of hurling. They currently compete in the Cork Intermediate A Hurling Championship. The club plays in the Avondhu division of Cork GAA.

In January 2023, the club won the All-Ireland Junior Club Hurling Championship.

The club only plays Hurling and the people who play Football around the area would play with Mitchelstown GAA

Honours
All-Ireland Junior Club Hurling Championship (1): 2023 (Runners-up in 2022)
Munster Junior Club Hurling Championship (2): 2021, 2022
Cork Premier Junior Hurling Championship (1): 2022
Cork Junior A Hurling Championship (1): 2021
North Cork Junior A Hurling Championship  (3): 2004, 2018, 2021
Cork Minor A Hurling Championship (1): 2016

Notable Players
Mark Keane
Darragh Flynn
Bob Honohan

Gaelic games clubs in County Cork
Hurling clubs in County Cork